George Royse DD (b. Martock, 27 May 1655d. Oriel College, Oxford, 27 May 1671) was Dean of Bristol from  1694 until his death.

Royse's first Oxford college was St Edmund Hall, Oxford. After that he became a  Fellow of Oriel College, Oxford. He was Provost of Oriel from 1691 until 1708. He was also Rector of Newington, Oxfordshire during the same dates.

References

17th-century English Anglican priests
18th-century English Anglican priests
Provosts of Oriel College, Oxford
Alumni of St Edmund Hall, Oxford
Deans of Bristol
1665 births
1708 deaths
People from Somerset